Alberta Provincial Highway No. 23, commonly referred to as Highway 23, is a highway in southern Alberta, Canada, east of Highway 2 that serves as an alternate route between Calgary and Lethbridge.

It continues north and passes by the Villages of Nobleford, Barons, and Carmangay before it crosses the Little Bow River. It continues north, passing through the Hamlet of Kirkcaldy and Town of Vulcan before it meets the junction of Highway 24 and Highway 542. From there, the highway turns west and passes near just north of the Hamlet of Brant and just south of the Hamlet of Blackie before skirting Frank Lake. It intersects Highway 2 and enters the Town of High River along 12 Avenue SE before becoming Highway 2A at 10 Street SE. In tandem with Highway 519, the southernmost portion of Highway 23 is frequently used as a bypass of Fort Macleod.

Major intersections 
From south to north:

References 

023
High River